José de Jesús Fernández (a.k.a. José Jesús Fernández) (ca. 1786 – ca. 1866) was Mayor of Ponce, Puerto Rico, from 1 July 1846 to 31 December 1846. He led the municipality under Spain's new Decreto Orgánico de 1846.

Mayoral term
De Jesús Fernández was the first mayor in Ponce to command power under the new Decreto Orgánico de 1846 (1846 Organic Decree). Decreto Orgánico de 1846 had been had been approved on 8 January 1845, and enacted on 27 February 1846 and went in effect on 1 July 1846, the first day that De Jesús Fernández took office.  This new Law for Municipalities allowed for increased centralization of public administration and greater political control over municipalities.

The municipal system resulting from Decreto Orgánico de 1846 produced the following local arrangement:
 Mayor: José de Jesús Fernández
 Deputy mayor: Julio Dubocq
 1st mayor: Juan Mandry
 2nd mayor: Flavius Dede
 3rd mayor: Jaime Guilbee
 4th mayor: Pablo Manfredi
 5th mayor: Juan Van Ryhn
 6th mayor: Mariano León
 7th mayor: Ignacio Tirado
 8th mayor: Carlos Vives
 9th mayor: Jaime Piris
 10th mayor: Ruperto Aponte
 11th mayor: Antonio Pereyra Brandao
 12th mayor: Irene Ortíz
 13th mayor: José Glivau
 1st mayor: José de la Rocha
 2nd mayor: Antonio Albizu

See also

 List of Puerto Ricans
 List of mayors of Ponce, Puerto Rico

Notes

References

Further reading
 Ramón Marín. Las Fiestas Populares de Ponce. Editorial Universidad de Puerto Rico. 1994.

External links
 Guardia Civil española (c. 1898) (Includes military ranks in 1880s Spanish Empire.)

Mayors of Ponce, Puerto Rico
1780s births
1860s deaths
Year of death uncertain
Year of birth uncertain